The Attorney General of Iowa is the chief legal officer of the State of Iowa, United States. 

The office was created February 9, 1853. The Office of the Attorney General is housed in the Lucas State Office Building in Des Moines; the attorney general also has a room in the Iowa State Capitol to prepare legislation.

As stated in Iowa law, the powers and duties of the office include: Representing the departments and agencies of state government; taking action for citizens in consumer protection and other areas; enforcing the state's environmental protection laws; playing a central role in the criminal justice system; and providing assistance and advocacy for the victims of crime.  The attorney general also issues legal opinions on questions of law submitted by elected or appointed state officials and defends all tort claim actions against the state. Iowa is unique in that its attorney general belongs to the judicial branch of government; in 48 of the other 50 states, the attorney general is a member of the executive branch.

Republican Brenna Bird has been Attorney General since 2023.

List of attorneys general of Iowa
Parties

References

External links
 Iowa Attorney General articles at ABA Journal
 News and Commentary at FindLaw
 Iowa Code at Law.Justia.com
 U.S. Supreme Court Opinions - "Cases with title containing: State of Iowa" at FindLaw
 The Iowa State Bar Association
 Iowa Attorney General Tom Miller profile at National Association of Attorneys General
 Press releases at Iowa Attorney General

 
1853 establishments in Iowa